Ravens  is a 2017 Swedish thriller film directed by Jens Assur, based on the novel Korparna by Tomas Bannerhed.

Plot 
In the 1970s Sweden, the farmer Agne (Reine Brynolfsson) is plagued by the work on the farm, and by the feeling that someone wants his family bad. The oldest son Klas (Jakob Nordström), who Agne wants to take over the farm, seeks himself to the worlds of birds, but as the outer threats increase, he faces an inevitable choice, fly or stay.

Cast 

 Reine Brynolfsson as Agne
 Maria Heiskanen as Gärd
 Jakob Nordström as Klas
  as Alvar
 Peter Dalle as Krister
 Saga Samuelsson as Veronika
 Jens Jørn Spottag as Carsten
 Gösta Viklund as Göran
 Max Vobora as Pelle Bula
  as Lecturer
  as Schoolmaster
 Annika Hallin as Veronika's mother
 Åsa Jansson as Librarian
 Lars-Gunnar Aronsson as Butcher

Reception

Critical response 
Ravens received mostly positive reception by the Swedish critics, with many celebrated the film for its acting and cinematography, while others criticized it for having a long runtime, and the lack of dialogue.

Accolades

References

External links 
 
 

Swedish drama films
Films directed by Jens Assur
Films based on Swedish novels
Films set in the 1970s
2017 drama films
2010s Swedish-language films
2010s Swedish films